Shatra (Şatra) is a rural locality (a village) in Satyyevsky Selsoviet, Miyakinsky District, Bashkortostan, Russia. The population was 9 as of 2010. There is 1 street.

Geography 
Shatra is located 13 km southwest of Kirgiz-Miyaki (the district's administrative centre) by road. Rzhanovka is the nearest rural locality.

References 

Rural localities in Miyakinsky District